The Yellow Banners were:

 Plain Yellow Banner
 Bordered Yellow Banner
 Yellow flag (disambiguation)